The 1999–2000 Liechtenstein Cup was the fifty-fifth season of Liechtenstein's annual cup competition. Seven clubs competed with a total of fifteen teams for one spot in the qualifying round of the UEFA Cup. Defending champions were FC Vaduz, who have won the cup continuously since 1998.

First round

|colspan="3" style="background-color:#99CCCC; text-align:center;"|19 October 1999

|-
|colspan="3" style="background-color:#99CCCC; text-align:center;"|20 October 1999

|}

Quarterfinals 

|colspan="3" style="background-color:#99CCCC; text-align:center;"|9 November 1999

|-
|colspan="3" style="background-color:#99CCCC; text-align:center;"|2 March 2000

|-
|colspan="3" style="background-color:#99CCCC; text-align:center;"|5 April 2000

|}

Semifinals 

|colspan="3" style="background-color:#99CCCC; text-align:center;"|11 April 2000

|-
|colspan="3" style="background-color:#99CCCC; text-align:center;"|12 April 2000

|}

Final

External links 
Official site of the LFV
RSSSF page

Liechtenstein Football Cup seasons
Cup
Liechtenstein Cup